The Alien and Sedition Acts were a set of four laws enacted in 1798 that applied restrictions to immigration and speech in the United States. The Naturalization Act increased the requirements to seek citizenship, the Alien Friends Act allowed the president to imprison and deport non-citizens, the Alien Enemies Act gave the president additional powers to detain non-citizens during times of war, and the Sedition Act criminalized false and malicious statements about the federal government. The Alien Friends Act and the Sedition Act expired after a set number of years, and the Naturalization Act was repealed in 1802. The Alien Enemies Act is still in effect.

The Alien and Sedition Acts were controversial. They were supported by the Federalist Party, and supporters argued that the bills strengthened national security during the Quasi-War, an undeclared naval war with France from 1798 to 1800. The acts were denounced by Democratic-Republicans as suppression of voters and violation of free speech under the First Amendment. While they were in effect, the Alien and Sedition Acts, and the Sedition Act in particular, were used to suppress publishers affiliated with the Democratic-Republicans, and several publishers were arrested for criticism of the Adams administration. The Democratic-Republicans took power in 1800, in part because of backlash to the Alien and Sedition Acts, and all but the Alien Enemies Act were eliminated by the next Congress. The Alien Enemies Act has been invoked several times since, particularly during World War II. The Alien and Sedition Acts are generally received negatively by modern historians, and the Supreme Court has since indicated that aspects of the laws would be found unconstitutional if challenged.

Acts

Alien Friends Act 
The Alien Friends Act (officially "An Act Concerning Aliens") authorized the president to arbitrarily deport any non-citizen that was determined to be "dangerous to the peace and safety of the United States." Once a non-citizen was determined to be dangerous, or was suspected of conspiring against the government, the president had the power to set a reasonable amount of time for departure, and remaining after the time limit could result to up to three years in prison. The law was never directly enforced, but it was often used in conjunction with the Sedition Act to suppress criticism of the Adams administration. Upon enactment, the Alien Friends Act was authorized for two years, and it was allowed to expire at the end of this period.

While the law was not directly enforced, it resulted in the voluntary departure of foreigners who feared that they would be charged under the act. The Adams administration encouraged these departures, and Secretary of State Timothy Pickering would ensure that the ships were granted passage. Though Adams did not delegate the final decision-making power, Secretary Pickering was responsible for overseeing enforcement of the Alien Friends Act. Both Adams and Pickering considered the law too weak to be effective; Pickering expressed his desire for the law to require sureties and authorize detainment prior to deportation.

Many French nationals were considered for deportation, but were allowed to leave willingly, or Adams declined to take action against them. These figures included: philosopher Constantin François de Chassebœuf, comte de Volney, General Victor Collot, scholar Médéric Louis Élie Moreau de Saint-Méry, diplomat Victor Marie du Pont, journalist William Duane, scientist Joseph Priestley, and journalist William Cobbett. Secretary Pickering also proposed applying the act against the French diplomatic delegation to the United States, but Adams refused. Journalist John Daly Burk agreed to leave under the act informally to avoid being tried for sedition, but he went into hiding in Virginia until the act's expiration.

Alien Enemies Act 
The Alien Enemies Act (officially "An Act Respecting Alien Enemies") was passed to supplement the Alien Friends Act, granting the government additional powers to regulate non-citizens that would take effect in times of war. Under this law, the president could authorize the arrest, relocation, or deportation of any non-citizen male residing in the United States that was 14 years or older. It also provided some legal protections for those subject to the law. The Alien Enemies Act was not allowed to expire with the other Alien and Sedition Acts, and it remains in effect as Chapter 3, Sections 21–24 of Title 50 of the United States Code. President James Madison invoked the act against British nationals during the War of 1812. President Woodrow Wilson invoked the act against nationals of the Central Powers during World War I. In 1918, an amendment to the act struck the provision restricting the law to males.

On December 7, 1941, in response to the bombing of Pearl Harbor, President Franklin D. Roosevelt used the authority of the revised Alien Enemies Act to issue presidential proclamations #2525 (Alien Enemies – Japanese), #2526 (Alien Enemies – German), and #2527 (Alien Enemies – Italian), to apprehend, restrain, secure, and remove Japanese, German, and Italian non-citizens. Roosevelt later cited further wartime powers to issue Executive Order 9066, which interned Japanese Americans using powers unrelated to the Alien Enemies Act. Hostilities with Germany and Italy ended in May 1945, and President Harry S. Truman issued presidential proclamation #2655 on July 14. The proclamation gave the Attorney General authority regarding enemy aliens within the continental United States, to decide whether they are “dangerous to the public peace and safety of the United States,” to order them removed, and to create regulations governing their removal, citing the Alien Enemies Act. On September 8, 1945, Truman issued presidential proclamation #2662, which authorized the Secretary of State to remove enemy aliens that had been sent to the United States from Latin American countries. On April 10, 1946, Truman issued presidential proclamation #2685, which modified the previous proclamation, and set a 30-day deadline for removal.

In Ludecke v. Watkins (1948), the Supreme Court interpreted the time of release under the Alien Enemies Act. German alien Kurt G. W. Ludecke was detained in 1941, under Proclamation 2526, and continued to be held after cessation of hostilities. In 1947, Ludecke petitioned for a writ of habeas corpus to order his release, after the Attorney General ordered him deported. The court ruled 5–4 to release Ludecke, but also found that the Alien Enemies Act allowed for detainment beyond the time hostilities ceased, until an actual treaty was signed with the hostile nation or government.

Naturalization Act 

The Naturalization Act increased the residency requirement for American citizenship from five to 14 years, and increased the notice time from three to five years. At the time, the majority of immigrants supported Thomas Jefferson and the Democratic-Republicans—the political opponents of the Federalists. It did not have an expiration date, but it was repealed by the Naturalization Law of 1802.

Sedition Act 
The Sedition Act made it illegal to make false or malicious statements about the federal government. The act was used to suppress speech critical of the Adams administration, including the prosecution and conviction of many Jeffersonian newspaper owners who disagreed with the Federalist Party. The Sedition Act did not extend enforcement to speech about the Vice President, as then-incumbent Thomas Jefferson was a political opponent of the Federalist-controlled Congress. The Sedition Act was allowed to expire in 1800, and its enactment is credited with helping Jefferson win the presidential election that year.

Prominent prosecutions under the Sedition Act included:
 James Thomson Callender, a British subject, had been expelled from Great Britain for his political writings. Living first in Philadelphia, then seeking refuge close by in Virginia, he wrote a book titled The Prospect Before Us (read and approved by Vice President Jefferson before publication), in which he called the Adams administration a “continual tempest of malignant passions,” and referred to the President as a “repulsive pedant, a gross hypocrite, and an unprincipled oppressor.” Callender, already residing in Virginia and writing for the Richmond Examiner, was indicted in mid-1800 under the Sedition Act, and was subsequently convicted, fined $200, and sentenced to nine months in jail.
 Matthew Lyon was a Democratic-Republican congressman from Vermont. He was the first individual to be placed on trial under the Alien and Sedition Acts. He was indicted in 1800 for an essay he had written in the Vermont Journal, where he had accused the administration of “ridiculous pomp, foolish adulation, and selfish avarice.” While awaiting trial, Lyon commenced publication of Lyon's Republican Magazine, subtitled "The Scourge of Aristocracy." At trial, he was fined $1,000, and sentenced to four months in jail. After his release, he returned to Congress.
 Benjamin Franklin Bache was the editor of the Philadelphia Aurora, a Democratic-Republican newspaper. Bache had accused George Washington of incompetence and financial irregularities, and ”the blind, bald, crippled, toothless, querulous Adams” of nepotism and monarchical ambition. He was arrested in 1798 under the Sedition Act, but he died of yellow fever before trial.
 Anthony Haswell was an English immigrant, and a printer of the Jeffersonian Vermont Gazette. Sourced from the Philadelphia Aurora, Haswell had reprinted Bache's claim that the federal government employed Tories. Haswell also published an advertisement from Lyon's sons for a lottery to raise money for his fine that decried Lyon's oppression by jailers exercising "usurped powers". Haswell was found guilty of seditious libel by judge William Paterson, and sentenced to a two-month imprisonment and a $200 fine.
 Luther Baldwin was indicted, convicted, and fined $100 for a drunken incident that occurred during a visit by President Adams to Newark, New Jersey. Upon hearing a gun report during a parade, he yelled "I hope it hit Adams in the arse."
 In November 1798, David Brown led a group in Dedham, Massachusetts, including Benjamin Fairbanks, in setting up a liberty pole with the words, "No Stamp Act, No Sedition Act, No Alien Bills, No Land Tax, downfall to the Tyrants of America; peace and retirement to the President; Long Live the Vice President." Brown was arrested in Andover, Massachusetts, but because he could not afford the $4,000 bail, he was taken to Salem for trial. Brown was tried in June 1799. Brown pleaded guilty, but Justice Samuel Chase asked him to name others who had assisted him. Brown refused, was fined $480, and sentenced to eighteen months in prison, the most severe sentence imposed under the Sedition Act.

History

The Alien and Sedition Acts were passed by Congress while it was controlled by the Federalist Party in 1798. Members of the Federalist Party grew increasingly distrustful of the opposing Democratic-Republican Party with the Democratic-Republicans' support of France in the midst of the French Revolution. Some appeared to desire a similar revolution in the United States to overthrow the government and social structure. Newspapers sympathizing with each side exacerbated the tensions by accusing the other side's leaders of corruption, incompetence, and treason. The spreading unrest in Europe and calls for secession in the United States appeared to threaten the newly formed American republic. Some of this agitation was seen by Federalists as having been caused by French and French-sympathizing immigrants. The Alien and Sedition Acts were supported for different reasons, including the prevention of potential unrest by targeting immigrants, restriction of speech that may induce crime, reduction of partisan divides by penalizing expressly partisan speech, and suppression of political opponents of the Federalists.

The Acts were highly controversial at the time, especially the Sedition Act. The Sedition Act, which was signed into law by Adams on July 14, 1798, was hotly debated in the Federalist-controlled Congress and passed only after multiple amendments softening its terms, such as enabling defendants to argue in their defense that their statements had been true. Still, it passed the House only after three votes and another amendment causing it to automatically expire in March 1801. They continued to be loudly protested and were a major political issue in the election of 1800. Opposition to them resulted in the also-controversial Virginia and Kentucky Resolutions, authored by James Madison and Thomas Jefferson. Upon assuming the presidency, Thomas Jefferson pardoned those still serving sentences under the Sedition Act, and Congress soon repaid their fines.

Reaction
After the passage of the highly unpopular Alien and Sedition Acts, protests occurred across the country, with some of the largest being seen in Kentucky, where the crowds were so large they filled the streets and the entire town square of Lexington. Critics argued that they were primarily an attempt to suppress voters who disagreed with the Federalist party and its teachings, and violated the right of freedom of speech in the First Amendment to the U.S. Constitution. They also raised concerns that the Alien and Sedition acts gave disproportionate power to the federal executive compared to state governments and other branches of the federal government. Noting the outrage among the populace, the Democratic-Republicans made the Alien and Sedition Acts an important issue in the 1800 presidential election campaign. While government authorities prepared lists of aliens for deportation, many aliens fled the country during the debate over the Alien and Sedition Acts, and Adams never signed a deportation order.

The Virginia and Kentucky state legislatures also passed the Kentucky and Virginia Resolutions, secretly authored by Thomas Jefferson and James Madison, denouncing the federal legislation. While the eventual resolutions followed Madison in advocating "interposition", Jefferson's initial draft would have nullified the Acts and even threatened secession. Jefferson's biographer Dumas Malone argued that this might have gotten Jefferson impeached for treason, had his actions become known at the time. In writing the Kentucky Resolutions, Jefferson warned that, "unless arrested at the threshold", the Alien and Sedition Acts would "necessarily drive these states into revolution and blood".

The Alien and Sedition Acts were never appealed to the Supreme Court, whose power of judicial review was not established until Marbury v. Madison in 1803. Subsequent mentions in Supreme Court opinions beginning in the mid-20th century have assumed that the Sedition Act would today be found unconstitutional. Most modern historians view the Alien and Sedition Acts in a negative light, considering them to have been a mistake.

See also
 Alien Act 1705 in Great Britain
 Seditious Meetings Act 1795 in Great Britain
 Espionage Act of 1917
 Logan Act of 1799
 Sedition Act of 1918
 Alien Registration Act of 1940

Notes

References

Bibliography

Further reading
 Berkin, Carol. A Sovereign People: The Crises of the 1790s and the Birth of American Nationalism (2017) pp 201–44.
 
 Bird, Wendell. Criminal Dissent: Prosecutions under the Alien and Sedition Acts of 1798. Harvard University Press, 2020.
Bird, Wendell. Press and Speech Under Assault: The Early Supreme Court Justices, the Sedition Act of 1798, and the Campaign Against Dissent. New York: Oxford University Press, 2016.
 
Halperin, Terri Diane. The Alien and Sedition Acts of 1798: Testing the Constitution. Johns Hopkins University Press, 2016.
 
 
 
  Chase was impeached and acquitted for his conduct of a trial under the Sedition act.
 
 
 
 
 Wineapple, Brenda, "Our First Authoritarian Crackdown" (review of Wendell Bird, Criminal Dissent: Prosecutions under the Alien and Sedition Acts of 1798, Harvard University Press, 2020, 546 pp.), The New York Review of Books, vol. LXVII, no. 11 (2 July 2020), pp. 39–40. Wineapple closes: "Jefferson said it all: 'I know not what mortifies me most, that I should fear to write what I think, or my country bear such a state of things.'"

Primary sources
 Randolph, J.W. The Virginia Report of 1799–1800, Touching the Alien and Sedition Laws; together with the Virginia Resolutions of December 21, 1798, the Debate and Proceedings thereon in the House of Delegates of Virginia, and several other documents illustrative of the report and resolutions

External links

 Full Text of Alien and Sedition Acts
 Alien and Sedition Acts and Related Resources from the Library of Congress
 Naturalization Act, 1798
 Alien Friends Act, Alien Enemies Act, Sedition Act, 1798
 50 U.S. Code § 21 – Restraint, regulation, 1918
 Presidential Proclamation 2525, Alien Enemies—Japanese, December 07, 1941
 Presidential Proclamation 2526, Alien Enemies—German, December 07, 1941
 Presidential Proclamation 2527, Alien Enemies—Italians, December 07, 1941
 Presidential Proclamation 2655—Removal of Alien Enemies, July 14, 1945
 Presidential Proclamation 2662—Removal of Alien Enemies, September 8, 1945
 Presidential Proclamation 2685—Removal of Alien Enemies, April 10, 1946
 Ludecke v. Watkins, 335 U.S. 160 (1948)

 
1798 in American law
5th United States Congress
Internment of Japanese Americans
Political repression in the United States
Presidency of John Adams
Alien and Sedition Acts of 1798
United States federal immigration and nationality legislation